ISO/IEC JTC 1/SC 35 User interfaces is a standardization subcommittee (SC), which is part of the joint technical committee, ISO/IEC JTC 1, of the International Organization for Standardization (ISO) and the International Electrotechnical Commission (IEC), that develops standards within the field of user-system interfaces in information and communication technology (ICT) environments. The subcommittee was founded at the 1998 Sendai ISO/IEC JTC 1 Plenary meeting, before which it was a working group directly under ISO/IEC JTC 1 (ISO/IEC JTC 1/WG 5). The international secretariat of ISO/IEC JTC 1/SC 35 is AFNOR (Association Française de Normalisation), located in France.

Scope and mission
The scope of ISO/IEC JTC 1/SC 35 is “Standardization in the field of user-system interfaces in information and communication technology (ICT) environments and support for these interfaces to serve all users, including people having accessibility or other specific needs, with a priority of meeting the JTC 1 requirements for cultural and linguistic adaptability,”  including:
 User interface accessibility (requirements, needs, methods, techniques and enablers)
 Cultural and linguistic adaptability and accessibility (such as evaluation of cultural and linguistic adaptability of ICT products, harmonized human language equivalents, localization parameters, voice messaging menus, etc.)
 User interface objects, actions and attributes
 Methods and technologies for controlling and navigating within systems, devices and applications in visual, auditory, tactile and other sensorial modalities (such as by voice, vision, movement, gestures, etc.)
 Symbols, functionality and interactions of user interfaces (such as graphical, tactile and auditory icons, graphical symbols and other user interface elements)
 Visual, auditory, tactile and other sensorial input and output devices and methods in ICT environments (for devices such as keyboards, displays, mice, etc.)
 User interfaces for mobile devices, hand-held devices and remote interactions

Structure
ISO/IEC JTC 1/SC 35 is made up of seven active working groups (WGs), each of which carries out specific tasks in standards development within the field of user interfaces, where the focus of each working group is described in the group’s terms of reference. The seven active working groups of ISO/IEC JTC 1/SC 35 are:

Collaborations
ISO/IEC JTC 1/SC 35 works in close collaboration with a number of other organizations or subcommittees, both internal and external to ISO or IEC, in order to boost synergies and share know-how but also to avoid conflicting or duplicative work. Organizations internal to ISO or IEC that collaborate with or are in liaison to ISO/IEC JTC 1/SC 35 include:
 ISO/IEC JTC 1/SC 2, Coded character sets
 ISO/IEC JTC 1/SC 36, Information technology for learning, education and training
 ISO/TC 159, Ergonomics
 ISO/TC 159/SC 4, Ergonomics of human system Interaction - Software ergonomics and human - computer dialogues
 ISO/TC 145, Graphical symbols
 IEC TC/SC 3C, Information structures, documentation and graphical symbols
 JWG 11 ISO/TC 145–IEC/SC 3C, Joint working group ISO/TC 145-IEC/SC 3C

Organizations external to ISO or IEC that collaborate with, or are in liaison to, ISO/IEC JTC 1/SC 35 include:
 World Wide Web Consortium (W3C)

Member Countries
Countries pay a fee to ISO to be members of subcommittees.
The 19 "P" (Participating) members of ISO/IEC JTC 1/SC 35 are: Canada, China, Denmark, Finland, France, Germany, Greece, India, Italy, Japan, Republic of Korea, Russian Federation, South Africa, Spain, Sweden, Switzerland, Ukraine, United Kingdom, and United States.
The 17 "O" (Observer) members of ISO/IEC JTC 1/SC 35 are: Austria, Belgium, Bosnia and Herzegovina, Bulgaria, Czech Republic, Ghana, Hungary, Indonesia, Islamic Republic of Iran, Ireland, Israel, Kenya, Netherlands, New Zealand, Poland, Romania, and Serbia .

Published Standards
As of 2013, ISO/IEC JTC 1/SC 35 has 51 published standards within the field of user interfaces, including:

See also
 ISO/IEC JTC 1	
 AFNOR
 International Organization for Standardization
 International Electrotechnical Commission

References

External links 
  ISO/IEC JTC 1/SC 35 home page
  Focusing on ISO/IEC JTC 1/SC 35 User interfaces

035